Tim O'Brien is an American politician and businessman serving as a member of the Indiana House of Representatives from the 78th district. He assumed office on March 30, 2021.

Early life and education 
O'Brien was born in Hobart, Indiana. He earned a Bachelor of Arts degree in economics from the University of Southern Indiana in 2015.

Career 
Outside of politics, O'Brien works as a real estate agent and broker. In 2019, he became president of the Southwest Indiana Association of Realtors. He was elected to the Indiana House of Representatives in a March 2021 special election.

References 

Living people
Republican Party members of the Indiana House of Representatives
People from Hobart, Indiana
People from Lake County, Indiana
University of Southern Indiana alumni
American real estate brokers
Year of birth missing (living people)